Roger Chartier, (born  December 9, 1945, in Lyon), is a French historian and historiographer who is part of the Annales school. He works on the history of books, publishing and reading. He teaches  at the École des Hautes Études en Sciences Sociales in Paris, the Collège de France, and  the University of Pennsylvania.

Biography 
Originally from Lyon, he studied at the Ampère lycée (high school). Between 1964 and 1969, he was a student at the École normale supérieure de Saint-Cloud and, at the same time, he pursued a 3-year-degree (French licence) followed by a master's degree at the Sorbonne (1966–1967). In 1969, he succeeded at his agrégation in history.

He taught as an associate professor at the Lycée Louis-le-Grand in Paris between 1969 and 1970. In the same year, he became assistant in Modern History at the University of Paris I, then senior lecturer at the Ecole des Hautes Etudes en Sciences Sociales (EHESS). He became a lecturer (from 1978 to 1983) and then director of studies at the EHESS until 2006. In 2006 he was appointed professor at the Collège de France, holder of the "Written Culture in Modern Europe" chair. He also hosts the show Les lundis de l'histoire on France Culture, in which he talks with historians who publish books on modern history (16th–18th centuries).

The works of Roger Chartier are described by Dorothea Kraus as follows: "Authors, texts, books, and readers are four poles linked by Roger Chartier's work on the history of written culture; poles between which he attempts to draw connections through a cultural history of social life. The concept of 'appropriation' makes it possible for this perspective not only to give rise to these research topics, but also put them in touch with reading practices that determine appropriation, and which, in turn, depend on the reading skills of a community of readers, author strategies, and text formats."

In 2009–10, he was the Weidenfeld Visiting Professor of European Comparative Literature in St Anne's College, Oxford.

Academic awards and honors 
 Winner of the 1990 Annual Award of the American Printing History Association 
 Grand Prix d'histoire (Grand prix Gobert) of the Académie française in 1992.

Publications

Selected books
Cultural History: Between Practices and Representations (Cornell University Press, 1989)
Translator Lydia G. Cochrane 
The Cultural Origins of the French Revolution (Bicentennial Reflections on the French Revolution) (Duke University Press Books, 1991)
The Order of Books: Readers, Authors, and Libraries in Europe Between the 14th and 18th Centuries (Stanford University Press, 1994)
Forms and Meanings: Texts, Performances, and Audiences from Codex to Computer (New Cultural Studies) (University of Pennsylvania Press, 1995)
On the Edge of the Cliff: History, Language and Practices (Parallax: Re-visions of Culture and Society) (The Johns Hopkins University Press, 1996)
Inscription and Erasure: Literature and Written Culture from the Eleventh to the Eighteenth Century (University of Pennsylvania Press, 2008)

Selected Edited Volumes
History of Private Life, Volume III: Passions of the Renaissance (Belknap Press of Harvard University Press, 1993)
Series edited by Phillippe Ariès and Georges Duby;  Volume editor Roger Chartier; Translated by Arthur Goldhammer
Correspondence: Models of Letter-Writing from the Middle Ages to the Nineteenth Century (Princeton University Press, 1997)
Composed of three essays by Chartier, Alain Boureau, and Cécile Dauphin
El Juego de las Reglas: Lecturas (Seccion de Obras de Historia) (Fondo de Cultura Económica, 2000)
Collected Essays by Chartier, Translated into Spanish by Jose E Burucua
A History of Reading in the West (Studies in Print Culture and the History of the Book) (University of Massachusetts Press, 2003)
Co-Editor Guglielmo Cavallo

Selected articles
 Chartier, Roger. "Review: Text, Symbols, and Frenchness," Journal of Modern History Vol. 57, No. 4 (Dec., 1985), pp. 682–695 in JSTOR
 Chartier, Roger. "Le monde comme représentation," Annales. Histoire, Sciences Sociales 44e Année, No. 6 (Nov. - Dec., 1989), pp. 1505–1520 in JSTOR
 Chartier, Roger. "Les arts de mourir, 1450-1600,"  Annales. Histoire, Sciences Sociales 31e Année, No. 1 (Jan. - Feb., 1976), pp. 51–75 in JSTOR
 Chartier, Roger. "Espace social et imaginaire social: les intellectuels frustrés au XVIIe siècle,"  Annales. Histoire, Sciences Sociales 37e Année, No. 2 (Mar. - April 1982), pp. 389–400 in JSTOR
 Chartier, Roger. "Review: L'ancien régime typographique: réflexions sur quelques travaux récents,"  Annales. Histoire, Sciences Sociales 36e Année, No. 2 (Mar. - Apr., 1981), pp. 191–209 in JSTOR

Further reading
 Hunt, Lynn. "French History in the Last Twenty Years: The Rise and Fall of the Annales Paradigm," Journal of Contemporary History Vol. 21, No. 2, Twentieth Anniversary Issue (Apr., 1986), pp. 209–224 in JSTOR

References 

Département Histoire - Paris VIII-Saint-Denis
Stanford Presidential Lectures in the Humanities and Arts: Roger Chartier

1945 births
University of Paris alumni
20th-century French historians
Academic staff of the University of Paris
University of Pennsylvania faculty
University of Pennsylvania historian
Walter H. Annenberg Professor
Living people
French male non-fiction writers
Corresponding Fellows of the British Academy
Lycée Louis-le-Grand teachers
21st-century French historians